Lambhua is a constituency of the Uttar Pradesh Legislative Assembly covering the city of Lambhua in the Sultanpur district of Uttar Pradesh, India.

Lambhua is one of five assembly constituencies in the Sultanpur Lok Sabha constituency. Since 2008, this assembly constituency is numbered 190 amongst 403 constituencies.

Election results

2022

2017
Bharatiya Janta Party candidate Devmani Dwivedi won in last Assembly election of 2017 Uttar Pradesh Legislative Elections defeating Bahujan Samaj Party candidate Vinod Singh by a margin of 12,903 votes.

References

External links
 

Assembly constituencies of Uttar Pradesh
Sultanpur district